Labelle is a provincial electoral district in the Laurentides region of Quebec, Canada that elects members to the National Assembly of Quebec. It notably includes the municipalities of Mont-Laurier, Mont-Tremblant, Rivière-Rouge, Mont-Blanc, Lac-des-Écorces and Labelle.

It was originally created for the 1912 election from part of the Ottawa electoral district. Its final election was in 1970.  It disappeared in the 1973 election and its successor electoral district was Laurentides-Labelle.  However, Laurentides-Labelle disappeared in the 1981 election and its successor electoral district was the re-created Labelle.

In the change from the 2001 to the 2011 electoral map, its territory was unchanged.

The riding is named after Antoine Labelle, the priest who help developed the Laurentides region north of Montreal during an economic crisis during the 1880s.

Members of the Legislative Assembly / National Assembly

Election results

|-
 
|Liberal
|Deborah Belanger
|align="right"|7,140
|align="right"|28.97
|align="right"|

|-

|-
|}

References

External links
Information
 Elections Quebec

Election results
 Election results (National Assembly)

Maps
 2011 map (PDF)
 2001 map (Flash)
2001–2011 changes (Flash)
1992–2001 changes (Flash)
 Electoral map of Laurentides region
 Quebec electoral map, 2011

Quebec provincial electoral districts
Mont-Laurier